Kəsəmən or Kesaman may refer to:
Aşağı Kəsəmən, Azerbaijan
Kəsəmən, Gadabay, Azerbaijan
Kəsəmən, Samukh, Azerbaijan
Kyasaman